Stomatella duplicata is a species of sea snail, a marine gastropod mollusk in the family Trochidae, the top snails.

Description
The height of the shell attains 14 mm, its diameter 14 mm. The rather solid shell has a depressed-globose shape with a conical spire. It is longitudinally striped with purplish or red and white. Its surface contains numerous fine, unequal spiral threads above and two strong nodose keels at the periphery, and about 7 subequal lirae on the base. Their interstices are spirally striate. The prominent spire contains three bicarinate whorls, the last notably so. They are concave above the carina and plicate below the sutures. The rounded aperture is oblique. The thin columella is concave. The white umbilical tract is a little grooved.

Distribution
This marine species occurs in the following locations:
 Red Sea
 the Philippines

References

External links
 To World Register of Marine Species
 

duplicata
Gastropods described in 1823